Zinc finger RNA binding protein is a protein in humans that is encoded by the ZFR gene.

References

Further reading 

Human proteins